The Adams was a 19th-century Boston pilot boat, built in 1888 by Moses Adams at Essex, Massachusetts for Captain John H. Jeffries. She was named for Melvin O. Adams, an American attorney and railroad executive. Her design was by yacht designer Edward Burgess, known for his America's Cup defenders. In 1901, she was one of only five pilot-boats left in the Boston fleet. In 1912, she was sold to haul gravel to Boston, then sold again where she landed in the Portuguese immigrant trade. She was sunk by enemy action during World War I.

Construction and service 

Boston Pilot Boat Adams, was built in 1888 by Moses Adams at Essex, Massachusetts for Captain John H. Jeffries and others. She was named in honor of the prominent Bostonian, Melvin O. Adams. Her design was by the American yacht designer, Edward Burgess, known for his America's Cup defenders, Puritan (1885, Mayflower (1886), and Volunteer (1887).

On September 24, 1889, the new pilot boat Adams, was launched and witnessed by a large gathering of people. Her dimensions were 88 feet in length by 22 feet in width, with 11 feet in depth; and 150 tons. She cost $13,000.

On March 3, 1890, Captain Jeffries of the new pilot-boat Adams, No. 4, beat the Hesper, No. 5, in a race from Boston Light, to board an incoming steamer. Each captain wanted to earn $125 by placing a pilot on board the vessel.

In 1900, Boston had seven pilots boats in commission. The Adams was Boston's pilot schooner number four. The other Boston boats included, the [[America (1897)|America,]] No. 1; Liberty, No. 3; Hesper, No. 5; Varuna, No. 6; Minerva, No. 7; and Sylph, No 8.

On April 29, 1900, Captain Thomas McLaughlin, D. Kendrick, F. C. Lefray, W. S. Dolliver, and S. J. Treat were pilots on the Adams, No. 4.

End of service

In 1901, Adams was one of only five pilot-boat schooners left in the Boston fleet. She was withdrawn from the Pilots' Association service in May 1912.

In November 1912, Adams'' was sold to Captain Frank D. McCarthy of East Boston man for $1,400. He used her to haul gravel from Maine to Boston. She then landed in the Portuguese immigrant trade. She was sunk by enemy action during World War I.

See also
List of Northeastern U. S. Pilot Boats

References 

Individual sailing vessels
Schooners of the United States
Service vessels of the United States
1889 ships
Pilot boats
Ships built in Essex, Massachusetts